Peaks, Valleys, Honky Tonks & Alleys is the eighth album by American singer-songwriter Michael Martin Murphey and his first live album. The first five tracks were recorded at the legendary Palomino Club in North Hollywood, Los Angeles, an important West Coast country music venue. The remaining five tracks are studio recordings. The live tracks showcase Murphey's early work with some interesting twists. His "Cosmic Cowboy" turns into a breakdown, while "Another Cheap Western" is coupled with The Olympics' 1958 hit, "Western Movies". The album produced the singles "Backslider's Wine" and "Chain Gang" that peaked at numbers 92 and 93 on the Billboard Hot Country Singles chart respectively.

It was the final album in which he was credited as "Michael Murphey"—all of his subsequent releases have been under his full name.

The woman featured on the album cover with Michael was his girlfriend and future wife (1980-2001), fashion model, Mary Maciukas

Track listing
 "Cosmic Cowboy" / "Cosmic Breakdown" (Murphey) – 6:08
 "Another Cheap Western / Western Movies" (Murphey, Cliff Goldsmith, Fred Sledge Smith) – 4:08
 "Years Behind Bars" (Murphey) – 3:11
 "Backslider's Wine" (Murphey) – 3:25
 "Geronimo's Cadillac" (Murphey, Charles Quarto) – 6:47
 "South Coast" (Murphey) – 4:05
 "Chain Gang" (Sam Cooke) – 3:57
 "Once a Drifter" (Murphey) – 4:41
 "Texas Morning" (Murphey, Castleman) – 4:12
 "Lightning" (Murphey) – 4:31

Credits
Music
 Michael Martin Murphey – vocals, guitar, piano, harmonica
 Sam Broussard – guitar, background vocals
 Dan Dugmore – steel guitar
 Doug Dillard – banjo
 Byron Berline – fiddle
 Rod Phillips – keyboards
 Jai Winding – keyboards
 Don Brooks – harmonica
 Bob Glaub – bass
 Mike Botts – drums
 Gary Coleman – percussion
 Tom Kelly – background vocals
 Katy Moffatt – background vocals
 Timothy B. Schmit – background vocals
 Bobby Kimball – background vocals

Production
 John Boylan – producer
 Paul Grupp – engineer

References

External links
 Michael Martin Murphey's Official Website

Michael Martin Murphey albums
1979 live albums
Albums produced by John Boylan (record producer)
Epic Records live albums